The Wisconsin Intercollegiate Athletic Conference men's ice hockey tournament is the annual conference ice hockey championship tournament for the NCAA Division III Wisconsin Intercollegiate Athletic Conference. The tournament has been held annually since 2014.

History
While the WIAC has existed since the 1910s, the number conference members that supported ice hockey programs had never reached the minimum required to receive an NCAA Tournament automatic bid (seven). Despite this hurdle, the conference elected to form an ice hockey division for the 2013–14 season, to become an all-sports conference. The WIAC tournament began the same season as the conference and includes all members schools.

2014

Note: * denotes overtime period(s)Note: Mini-games in italics

2015

Note: * denotes overtime period(s)Note: Mini-games in italics

2016

Note: * denotes overtime period(s)Note: Mini-games in italics

2017

Note: * denotes overtime period(s)Note: Mini-games in italics

2018

Note: * denotes overtime period(s)Note: Mini-games in italics

2019

Note: * denotes overtime period(s)Note: Mini-games in italics

2020

Note: * denotes overtime period(s)Note: Mini-games in italics

2021

Note: * denotes overtime period(s)

2022

Note: * denotes overtime period(s)

2023

Note: * denotes overtime period(s)

Championships

References

External links

Ice hockey
Wisconsin Intercollegiate Athletic Conference
Recurring sporting events established in 2014